is a public university in Maebashi, Gunma, Japan. The predecessor of the school was founded in 1952 and was chartered as a university in 1997.

External links
 Official website 

Educational institutions established in 1997
Public universities in Japan
Universities and colleges in Gunma Prefecture
Engineering universities and colleges in Japan
Maebashi
1997 establishments in Japan